Tomislav Zubčić (born January 17, 1990) is a Croatian professional basketball player for the London Lions of the British Basketball League (BBL) and EuroCup. Standing at 2.11 m (6 ft 11 in), he plays both the power forward and center positions.

Professional career

NBA
On June 28, 2012, Zubčić was selected by the Toronto Raptors with the 56th overall pick in the 2012 NBA draft. On June 30, 2015, his rights were traded to the Oklahoma City Thunder in exchange for Luke Ridnour and cash considerations.

On September 17, 2016, the Thunder renounced to Zubčić's draft rights, making him eligible to sign with any NBA team.

Europe
Zubčić grew up with KK Zadar youth teams and with Cibona Zagreb juniors. He spent the 2007–08 season with KK Rudeš before returning to Cibona for the 2008–09 season. He went on to win three championships with Cibona, departing the club on January 16, 2013, in order to join Lietuvos rytas of the Lithuanian League. He played half a season with Lietuvos before returning to Croatia for the 2013–14 season, signing with Cedevita Zagreb on September 27, 2013. He played for Cedevita until October 2015, leaving the club after appearing in just nine games to begin the 2015–16 season.

D-League
On December 24, 2015, Zubčić was acquired by the Oklahoma City Blue, the Thunder's D-League affiliate. He made his debut the next day in a 99–84 loss to the Sioux Falls Skyforce.

Return to Europe
On September 29, 2016, Zubčić signed a one-month contract with Russian club Avtodor Saratov.

On December 2, 2016, he signed with Russian club Nizhny Novgorod for the rest of the season.

On July 28, 2017, he signed with Turkish club Trabzonspor.

On November 22, 2017, he signed with the German team Telekom Baskets Bonn.

On August 20, 2018, he signed with Igokea. On January 8, 2019, Zubčić left Igokea and signed for Baxi Manresa.

In July 2019, Zubčić signed with Enisey, returning to the VTB United League.

On December 25, 2020, he has signed with Tofaş of the Turkish Basketbol Süper Ligi (BSL).

National team career
Zubčić won the bronze medal at the 2008 Junior European Championship. He later won a second bronze medal at the 2009 U-19 World Championship in New Zealand.

References

External links
 Eurocup profile
 FIBA profile
 

1990 births
Living people
ABA League players
Bàsquet Manresa players
Basketball players from Zadar
BC Avtodor Saratov players
BC Enisey players
BC Rytas players
BC Nizhny Novgorod players
Croatian expatriate basketball people in Spain
Croatian expatriate basketball people in Turkey
Croatian expatriate basketball people in the United States
Croatian men's basketball players
KK Cedevita players
KK Cibona players
KK Igokea players
Oklahoma City Blue players
Power forwards (basketball)
Telekom Baskets Bonn players
Tofaş S.K. players
Toronto Raptors draft picks
Trabzonspor B.K. players